Adam Lambert  (born 5 October 1997) is an Australian snowboarder who competes internationally.

He made his world cup debut in 2017, and first world championships start at the 
2017 World Championships in Sierra Nevada, Spain. He represented Australia at the 2018 Winter Olympics in Pyeonchang.

References

External links

1997 births
Living people
Australian male snowboarders
Olympic snowboarders of Australia
Snowboarders at the 2018 Winter Olympics
Snowboarders at the 2022 Winter Olympics
People from the Monaro (New South Wales)
Sportsmen from New South Wales